The Communauté de communes des Ballons des Hautes-Vosges is an administrative association of rural communes in the Vosges department of eastern France. It was created in 2012 by the merger of the former Communauté de communes des Mynes et Hautes-Vosges du sud and Communauté de communes des Ballons des Hautes Vosges et de la Source de la Moselle. It consists of 8 communes, and has its administrative offices at Le Thillot. Its area is 194.5 km2, and its population was 14,987 in 2019.

Composition
The communauté de communes consists of the following 8 communes:

Bussang
Ferdrupt
Fresse-sur-Moselle
Le Ménil
Le Thillot
Ramonchamp
Rupt-sur-Moselle
Saint-Maurice-sur-Moselle

See also 

 List of intercommunalities of the Vosges department

References

Ballons des Hautes-Vosges
Ballons des Hautes-Vosges